Ptilothyris crocophracta is a moth in the family Lecithoceridae. It was described by Edward Meyrick in 1938. It is found in the Democratic Republic of the Congo (Orientale).

References

Moths described in 1938
Ptilothyris
Taxa named by Edward Meyrick
Endemic fauna of the Democratic Republic of the Congo